The Circuit de Constantine was a one-day cycling race held in 2015 and 2016 in Algeria, that was rated 1.2 and held as part of the UCI Africa Tour. Hichem Chaabane initially won the 2015 edition of the race, but tested positive for a banned substance in April 2015. As such he was stripped of the title.

Winners

References

Cycle races in Algeria
2015 establishments in Algeria
Recurring sporting events established in 2015
2016 disestablishments in Algeria
Recurring sporting events disestablished in 2016
UCI Africa Tour races